Bucculatrix copeuta is a moth in the family Bucculatricidae. It is found in North America, where it has been recorded from Ontario and Maine. The species was first described in 1919 by Edward Meyrick.

The larvae possibly feed on Prunus pensylvanica.

References

Natural History Museum Lepidoptera generic names catalog

Bucculatricidae
Moths described in 1919
Taxa named by Edward Meyrick
Moths of North America